Kirill Nikolayevich Levnikov (born 11 February 1984) is a Russian professional football referee and a former player.

He has been a FIFA referee since 2016.

His father Nikolai Levnikov was also an international referee.

References 

1984 births
Footballers from Saint Petersburg
Living people
Russian footballers
FC Salyut Belgorod players
Russian football referees
Association football defenders
FC Sever Murmansk players